Mumia flava is a bacterium from the genus Mumia which has been isolated from mangrove soil in Kuantan, Malaysia.

References 

Propionibacteriales
Bacteria described in 2014